Gredmarie Colón Jiménez (born October 7, 1988) is a Puerto Rican model, actress, reporter and TV host.

Career
She was the first runner-up of the beauty pageant/reality show Nuestra Belleza Latina 2011. She formerly appeared as a TV reporter/presenter on the Univision morning show Tu Mañana and was the host of La Hora del Chavo.

She appeared as the social media ambassador and co-host of the TV program Rubén & Co., alongside Rubén Sánchez and Daniela Droz. She is currently the presenter on the program Lo sé Todo in Wapa Puerto Rico.

Personal life 
Gredmarie Colon announced her pregnancy in mid-2015, giving birth to daughter Kamilia Thompson Colon that same year.

References

External links
 Gredmarie Colón Profile on Univision

1988 births
Living people
Participants in American reality television series